Kasaragod (Casrod) Lok Sabha constituency is one of the 20 Lok Sabha (parliamentary) constituencies in Kerala state in southern India.

Assembly segments
Kasaragod Lok Sabha constituency is composed of the following assembly segments:

Members of Parliament

Election results

General Election 2019

General Election 2014

General Election 2009

See also
 Kasaragod district
 Kannur district
 List of Constituencies of the Lok Sabha
 2019 Indian general election in Kerala

References

External links
 Election Commission of India: http://www.eci.gov.in/StatisticalReports/ElectionStatistics.asp]
2019 Kasaragod Lok Sabha Constituency Election Results and Candidates List 
Kasaragod  Lok Sabha Elections Asianet News survey results 2019

Lok Sabha constituencies in Kerala
Politics of Kasaragod district